Mettur is a state legislative assembly constituency in Salem district in the Indian state of Tamil Nadu. Its State Assembly Constituency number is 85. It comprises a portion of Mettur taluk and is a part of the wider Dharmapuri constituency for national elections to the Parliament of India. It is one of the 234 State Legislative Assembly Constituencies in Tamil Nadu, in India. Elections and winners in the constituency are listed below.

Madras State

Tamil Nadu

Election results

2021

2016

2011

2006

2001

1996

1991

1989

1984

1980

1977

1971

1967

1962

1957

References 

 

Assembly constituencies of Tamil Nadu
Salem district